Loneliness is the third Mandarin album by Taiwanese singer Evan Yo (Mandarin pinyin: Tsai Min-you)（中文名：蔡旻佑), released on 9 October 2009 by Sony Music Taiwan. The songs are a mixture of pop and rock numbers, including pop rock, punk rock, R&B and ballads genres. Yo worked on the album with four producers and a variety of songwriters and musicians.

The song "打不倒男孩", was the theme song of the UBA Basketball Competition. Yo performed the song live during half-time. Original songs were written by Yo along with "打不倒男孩", written by international songwriters Roxanne Seeman, Robin Grubert, and Ali Zuckowski.

A special limited edition was released with a bonus DVD including five music videos.

Background 
Yo spent 6 months, 12 hours a day at the piano writing songs for his third album. In the process, he put his personal feelings into the ten songs he created.  The songs ranged from ballad, "Loneliness", to punk-rock "Can't Beat The Boy (打不倒男孩)" and include pop, rock and R&B.

Track listing

References 

Sony Music Taiwan albums
2009 albums
Mandopop albums